

The Bratukhin B-5 was a prototype Soviet twin-rotor transport helicopter designed by the Bratukhin aircraft design bureau.

Development
The B-5 was an improved and larger design based on the bureau's earlier G-4, a twin-rotor helicopter, with each rotor driven by an Ivchenko AI-26 radial engine. Each engine was housed in a pod on an outrigger with the related rotor above. The programme was delayed waiting for appropriate engines and the B-5 was not completed until 1947, it only made a few short hops before the programme was abandoned due to vibration and structural flexing.

An air ambulance variant, the Bratukhin B-9 was built but was abandoned without being flown. Another variant was the Bratukhin B-10 which had uprated 575 hp (429 kW) engines and was modified for use in the artillery observation role with the military designation VNP (Vosdushnii Nabludatelnii Punk - Aerial Observation Point). The B-10 had three-seat for the crew, the cabin could hold three passengers or equipment. The B-10 flew in 1947 but although it did not have the wing stiffness problems of the B-54, demonstrating adequate handling like the B-5 and B-9 was also abandoned.  A variant with an improved performance was built as the Bratukhin B-11.

Variants
B-5
Prototype, one built.
B-9
Prototype air ambulance variant, one built.
B-10
Prototype observation and reconnaissance variant, one built.

Specifications (B-10)

See also

References

Notes

Bibliography

 
 

1940s Soviet military utility aircraft
Military helicopters
Abandoned military aircraft projects of the Soviet Union
B-5
1940s Soviet helicopters
Twin-engined piston helicopters